{{Taxobox
| image =  Schoenomyza litorella, Glaslyn, North Wales, July 2013 2 (16802508835).jpg
| image_caption = Schoenomyza litorella North Wales
| regnum = Animalia
| phylum = Arthropoda
| classis = Insecta
| ordo = Diptera
| subordo = Brachycera
| familia = Muscidae
| genus = Schoenomyza
| species = 'S.  litorella| binomial = Schoenomyza litorella| binomial_authority = (Fallen, 1823) 
| synonyms = 
}}Schoenomyza litorella is a fly from the family Muscidae. It is found in the Palearctic .

References

External links
D'Assis Fonseca, E.C.M, 1968 Diptera Cyclorrhapha Calyptrata: Muscidae Handbooks for the Identification of British Insects pdf
Seguy, E. (1923) Diptères Anthomyides. Paris: Éditions Faune de France'' Faune n° 6 393 p., 813 fig.Bibliotheque Virtuelle Numerique  pdf

Muscidae
Diptera of Europe
Insects described in 1823